The following is a list of flags of Sweden.

National flag and state flag

Royal standards

Governmental flags

Military flags

Flags of the Navy

Historical flags

Party flags

Regional flags

Each official flag is based on the coat of arms for the county, see gallery, and used on buildings etc. used by respective county administration. Unofficial flags are used by private and local people.

Swedish municipals often use flags that simply are the actual coat of arms transferred into a flag. See List of municipalities of Sweden where you can see the arms and links to each municipal.

Swedish shipping company

See also

 Coat of arms of Sweden
 Du gamla, Du fria
 Kungssången

References

 
Lists and galleries of flags
Nordic Cross flags
Flags